Srdjan Luchin (born 4 March 1986) is a former Romanian footballer, who played mainly as a center back, but also as a right back.

Club career

Politehnica Timișoara
Luchin made his Liga I debut in 2007 against Dinamo București, the game ended 1–1.

Dinamo București
Dinamo București announced the transfer of Luchin in August 2011. The player signed a contract for 5 years with the club. Manager Liviu Ciobotariu introduced Luchin immediately in the first squad as right defender. He scored his first goal for Dinamo in a Romanian Cup game against Luceafărul Oradea. Luchin was chosen man of the match for his performance.

Botev Plovdiv
Luchin arrived in Botev Plovdiv on 11 January 2014, signing a contract for two and a half years with the club.

Steaua București
On 5 August 2014, Luchin signed a two-year contract with Steaua București.

Levski Sofia
Luchin signed a one-and-a-half-year contract with Levski Sofia in January 2016. His contract was not renewed and he left the club in May 2017.

Personal life
Luchin was born in a family of Serbian ethnicity in the village of Variaș, Timiș County.

Career statistics

International career
Luchin played 11 matches and scored one goal for Romania, making his international debut on 10 August 2011, when he came as a substitute and replaced Bănel Nicoliță in the 80th minute of a friendly which ended with a 1–0 victory against San Marino. He played in two matches at the Euro 2012 qualifiers against France which ended 0–0 and in a 1–1 in Tirana, against Albania, in which he scored his only goal for the national team, thus becoming the first player of Serbian descent since 2008 to score a goal against the Albanian team. Luchin's last appearance for the national team was on 18 November 2014 in a friendly which ended with a 2–0 victory against Denmark.

International stats

International goals

Honours
Dinamo București
Cupa României: 2011–12
Supercupa României: 2012
Botev Plovdiv
 Bulgarian Cup runner-up: 2013–14
Steaua București
Liga I: 2014–15
Cupa României: 2014–15
Cupa Ligii: 2014-15
CFR Cluj
Liga I: 2017–18

References

External links
 
 
 

1986 births
Living people
Romanian footballers
Romania under-21 international footballers
Romania international footballers
CS Minaur Baia Mare (football) players
FC Olimpia Satu Mare players
FC Politehnica Timișoara players
FC Dinamo București players
Botev Plovdiv players
FC Steaua București players
ACS Poli Timișoara players
PFC Levski Sofia players
CFR Cluj players
FC Viitorul Constanța players
FC Dunărea Călărași players
FC Hermannstadt players
FC Universitatea Cluj players
Liga I players
Liga II players
First Professional Football League (Bulgaria) players
Romanian expatriate footballers
Expatriate footballers in Bulgaria
Romanian expatriate sportspeople in Bulgaria
Association football defenders
People from Timiș County
Romanian people of Serbian descent